Taskin in Iran may refer to:
 Taskin, Qazvin
 Taskin, Zanjan